was a  after Jōgen and before Eikan. This period spanned the years from November 978 through April 983.

Change of era

 February 20, 978 : The new era name was created to mark an event or a number of events. The previous era ended and a new one commenced in Jōgen 3, on the 15th day of the 4th month of 976.

Events of the Tengen era
 978 (Tengen 1, 8th month): The emperor allowed the daughter of Fujiwara no Kaneie to be introduced into his household; and shortly thereafter, they had a son.
 978 (Tengen 1, 10th month): Fujiwara no Yoritada was elevated to the position of Daijō-daijin; Minamoto no Masanobu was made Sadaijin; and, Fujiwara no Kaneie was made Udaijin.Notes

References
 Brown, Delmer M. and Ichirō Ishida, eds. (1979).  Gukanshō: The Future and the Past. Berkeley: University of California Press. ;  OCLC 251325323
 Nussbaum, Louis-Frédéric and Käthe Roth. (2005).  Japan encyclopedia. Cambridge: Harvard University Press. ;  OCLC 58053128
 Titsingh, Isaac. (1834). Nihon Ōdai Ichiran; ou,  Annales des empereurs du Japon.  Paris: Royal Asiatic Society, Oriental Translation Fund of Great Britain and Ireland. OCLC 5850691
 Varley, H. Paul. (1980). A Chronicle of Gods and Sovereigns: Jinnō Shōtōki of Kitabatake Chikafusa''. New York: Columbia University Press. ;  OCLC 6042764

External links
 National Diet Library, "The Japanese Calendar" -- historical overview plus illustrative images from library's collection

Japanese eras